Peter Martin Orla Lehmann (15 May 1810 – 13 September 1870) was a Danish statesman, a key figure in the development of Denmark's parliamentary government.

His father was German, born in Haselau at Uetersen in Holstein, while his mother was Danish and the daughter of a mayor in Copenhagen. The family belonged to the same social circle as the Ørsted brothers and the poet Oehlenschläger. After a year studying literature, when he read Heine in the company of Hans Christian Andersen, he began his studies in law. After a study program which he found tedious, he graduated in 1833.

Although of German extraction, Orla Lehmann's sympathies were with the Danish National Liberal Party. and he contributed to the liberal journal Kjøbenhavnsposten while he was a student, and from 1839 to 1842 edited, with Christian N. David, Fædrelandet. In 1842 he was condemned to three months imprisonment for a radical speech. He took a considerable part in the demonstrations of 1848, and was regarded as the leader of the Eider-Danes, that is, of the party which regarded the Eider River as the boundary of Denmark, and the Duchy of Schleswig as an integral part of the kingdom. He was one of the main authors of the Danish liberal Constitution of 1848.

He entered the Cabinet of Moltke I in March 1848, and was employed on diplomatic missions to London and Berlin in connection with the Schleswig-Holstein Question but left the cabinet the same year because of his dissatisfaction with the political situation. As a local official in Jutland he was for some months in 1849 a prisoner of the Schleswig-Holsteiners at Gottorp. A member of the Folketing from 1851 to 1853, of the Landsting from 1854 to 1870, and from 1856 to 1866 of the Rigsråd, he became Minister of the Interior in 1861 in the cabinet of K. C. Hall, retiring with him in 1863.

During these years he was overshadowed by the younger National Liberals especially by Hall, however, he in many ways did great work behind the scenes, for instance, it was he who carried through the law of women's economic independence. His last years were embittered by the defeat of 1864 and by his presentiment of the new German great power. He died in Copenhagen in September 1870.

Being one of the most stirring speakers of early Danish parliamentarian life (almost like Lamartine in France), and besides a charming and committed man, Lehmann, however, seems to have lacked some sense of reality. As "the freedom fighter of 1848", he remained a national hero in Denmark for several generations.

His book On the Causes of the Misfortunes of Denmark (1864) went through many editions, and his works were published posthumously in four volumes.

He was married to Maria Puggaard (1821–1849), the daughter of Hans Puggaard, who died young. His only daughter, Margrethe Rode, later Vullum (1846–1918) was a journalist and literary critic. His two grandsons were the politician Ove Rode and the author Helge Rode.

References 
 Orla Lehmann: . 4 vol.   Copenhagen, 1872–1874
 Orla Lehmann: ; published by Julius Clausen.  Copenhagen, 1903
 Orla Lehmann: .   Copenhagen, 1864 ('On the causes of the misfortunes of Denmark')
 C. E. F. Reinhardt: .   Copenhagen, 1871
Jürgen Beyer & Johannes Jensen (Copenhagen: C. A. Reitzel, 2000), pp. 113–131

External links 
 

1810 births
1870 deaths
19th-century Copenhagen City Council members
Burials at Holmen Cemetery
Danish Interior Ministers
Danish people of German descent
Members of the Folketing
Members of the Landsting (Denmark)
Politicians from Copenhagen
University of Copenhagen alumni